The Mosport Trans-Am race was an annual SCCA Trans-Am Series sports car race held at Canadian Tire Motorsport Park (formerly known as Mosport Park and Mosport International Raceway) in Bowmanville, Ontario, Canada.  The first race was held in 1976.

Winners

See also 

Grand Prix of Mosport
Chevrolet Silverado 250
Mosport 200
Mosport Can-Am
Canadian Grand Prix
Canadian Motorcycle Grand Prix
Telegraph Trophy 200 / Molson Diamond Indy

External links 
Canadian Tire Motorsport Park
Trans-Am Series
World Sports Racing Prototypes Trans-Am archive
Racing Sports Cars Mosport archive
Ultimate Racing History Mosport archive

References 

Auto races in Canada
Trans-Am Series
Sports car races
Sport in Ontario
Clarington
1976 establishments in Ontario
Recurring sporting events established in 1976
Tourist attractions in the Regional Municipality of Durham